Fisher test may refer to:

 Fisher's exact test, a statistical significance test  
 Miller Fisher test, a medical diagnostic procedure